The following elections occurred in 1960.

Africa
 1960 Cameroonian parliamentary election
 1960 Belgian Congo general election
 1960 Dahomeyan parliamentary election
 1960 Dahomeyan presidential election
 1960 Gambian legislative election
 1960 Ghanaian presidential election
 1960 Ivorian general election
 1960 Malagasy parliamentary election
 1960 British Somaliland parliamentary election
 1960 South African republic referendum
 1960 Tanganyikan general election

America
 1960 Antigua and Barbuda general election
 1960 Argentine legislative election
 1960 Falkland Islands general election
 1960 Panamanian general election
 1960 Salvadoran legislative election

Canada
 1960 British Columbia general election
 1960 Edmonton municipal election
 1960 New Brunswick general election
 1960 Northwest Territories general election
 1960 Nova Scotia general election
 1960 Ottawa municipal election
 1960 Quebec general election
 1960 Saskatchewan general election
 1960 Toronto municipal election

United States
 United States House of Representatives elections in California, 1960
 1959–60 Louisiana gubernatorial election
 1960 Maine gubernatorial election
 1960 Massachusetts gubernatorial election
 1960 Minnesota gubernatorial election
 1960 United States presidential election
 United States House of Representatives elections in South Carolina, 1960
 1960 United States House of Representatives elections

United States Senate
 1960 United States Senate elections
 United States Senate election in Massachusetts, 1960
 United States Senate election in North Carolina, 1960
 United States Senate special election in North Dakota, 1960
 United States Senate election in South Carolina, 1960

Asia
 1960 Burmese general election
 July 1960 Ceylonese parliamentary election
 March 1960 Ceylonese parliamentary election
 1960 Iranian legislative election
 1960 Japanese general election
 March 1960 South Korean presidential election
 1960 Taiwan presidential election

Europe
 1960 Danish parliamentary election
 1960 Swedish general election

United Kingdom
 1960 Bolton East by-election
 1960 Brighouse and Spenborough by-election
 1960 Ebbw Vale by-election
 1960 Labour Party leadership election

Oceania
 1960 New Zealand general election
 1960 Queensland state election

See also

 
1960
Elections